Penicillium jugoslavicum is an anamorph species of the genus of Penicillium which was isolated from seeds of Helianthus annuus L.

References

jugoslavicum
Fungi described in 1984